Bernhard Günther (November 4, 1906 – October 31, 1981) was a German politician of the Christian Democratic Union (CDU) and former member of the German Bundestag.

Life 
In 1945 he was a co-founder of the CDU in Cologne.

Since 1947 Günther was a city councillor in Cologne, in 1948 he was elected by the state parliament to the economic council of the Bizone. Günther was a member of the German Bundestag from its first election in 1949 to 1965. He was always directly elected to parliament in the constituency of Düren-Monschau-Schleiden. Günther was a member of the Bundestag's finance and transport committees

Literature

References

See also

1906 births
1981 deaths
Members of the Bundestag for North Rhine-Westphalia
Members of the Bundestag 1961–1965
Members of the Bundestag 1957–1961
Members of the Bundestag 1953–1957
Members of the Bundestag 1949–1953
Members of the Bundestag for the Christian Democratic Union of Germany